Padmé Amidala (née Naberrie) is a fictional character in the Star Wars franchise, appearing in the prequel trilogy portrayed by Natalie Portman. First indirectly mentioned in Return of the Jedi, she is introduced in The Phantom Menace as the teenage Queen of Naboo, and after her reign, becomes a senator and an anti-war activist in the Galactic Senate. She secretly marries  Anakin Skywalker, a Jedi Knight, then later dies while giving birth to twins Luke Skywalker and Leia Organa. Anakin's fear of losing Padmé serves as the catalyst in driving him to the dark side of the Force and becoming Darth Vader.

Critical reception to Padmé was mixed; some praised the personal and political motives of the character, while others criticized the regression to a plot device for Anakin's fall to the dark side. Portman's performance received mixed reviews as well, though some have blamed the performance on Lucas' direction and script. Despite the mixed reaction to the character's portrayal, the role helped Portman gain international recognition. In addition to being one of three primary characters in the prequel trilogy, Padmé has also appeared in other Star Wars media such as The Clone Wars.

Concept and creation

In initial drafts of the Star Wars story, "Leia is the daughter of Owen Lars and his wife Beru and seems to be Luke's cousin—together they visit the grave of his mother, who perished with his father on a planet destroyed by the Death Star." In an interview, Lucas answered a question about the development of characters like Obi-Wan Kenobi, Luke, and Leia; their mother was not a factor:

The first [version] talked about a princess and an old general. The second version involved a father, his son, and his daughter; the daughter was the heroine of the film. Now the daughter has become Luke, Mark Hamill's character.

Film historian Laurent Bouzereau reports that the second draft of the screenplay for Return of the Jedi contained dialogue in which Obi-Wan explains to Luke that he has a twin sister. She and their mother were "sent to the protection of friends in a distant system. The mother died shortly thereafter, and Luke's sister was adopted by Ben's friends, the governor of Alderaan and his wife." Lucas is quoted as saying:

The part that I never really developed is the death of Luke and Leia's mother. I had a backstory for her in earlier drafts, but it basically didn't survive. When I got to Jedi, I wanted one of the kids to have some kind of memory of her because she will be a key figure in the new episodes I'm writing. But I really debated whether or not Leia should remember her.

When Lucas drafted the script for The Phantom Menace, he envisioned a "link between Padmé and Princess Leia, the daughter who follows so closely in her footsteps." According to Natalie Portman, "It definitely did come into play how strong and smart a character Carrie Fisher portrayed, because I think that a lot of that is passed on from parent to child. I think George wrote Amidala as a strong, smart character, but it helped to know that I had this great woman before me who had portrayed her character as a fiery woman." Paul McDonald notes that there are "inevitable comparisons" between the two characters: "both develop soft spots for rogue pilots, and both have a knack for slipping into and out of stilted British accents."

Design and casting
According to concept artist Iain McCaig, the earliest reference to Portman came about through his designs for the character. In a 2022 interview with Star Wars Insider, he stated that Princess Ozma, the fictional ruler from the Land of Oz series of novels by L. Frank Baum, was a direct influence on his visualizations.  McCaig related the succinct instructions that Lucasfilm provided to artists for the characters, saying, "Amidala was described as 'kind of like Ozma' from The Wizard of Oz." According to McCaig, he chose Portman as a model for his designs because he felt she evoked the Oz character, saying, "She had Ozma's aura of vulnerability and strength." After producer/director George Lucas discussed this with McCaig, the producer inquired, "Do you know this girl?" McCaig replied, "No sir. But she's your queen."

George Lucas, Rick McCallum, and casting director Robin Gurland auditioned over 200 actresses for the part of Padmé Amidala. They chose 16-year-old actress Natalie Portman to play the role. According to The Phantom Menace production notes, "The role required a young woman who could be believable as the ruler of that planet, but at the same time be vulnerable and open." Portman's performances in The Professional (1994) and Beautiful Girls (1996) impressed Lucas. He stated, "I was looking for someone who was young, strong, along the lines of Leia. Natalie embodied all those traits and more."

Portman was unfamiliar with Star Wars at the time of her casting. She said, "My cousins had always been obsessed with the films, yet I hadn't even seen them before I got the part. When it all happened for me, my cousins were exclaiming, 'Oh, my God, you're in Star Wars!'" She told a CNN interviewer, "I really wasn't aware of how big a deal Star Wars was ... and when I saw the films, I really liked them, but I still didn't really understand how many ... were passionate fans of this film." Portman was, however, enthusiastic over being cast as the queen of Naboo, a character she expected to become a role model: "It was wonderful playing a young queen with so much power. I think it will be good for young women to see a strong woman of action who is also smart and a leader."

In The Phantom Menace, Portman had to portray a character younger than herself. In Attack of the Clones, however, her character had aged 10 years. Portman had aged only three years between the two films. She remarks, "[Lucas] wants to make sure I seem older than Anakin in Attack of the Clones, so it's believable that I can be bossing him around, and he's a little intimidated. She looks at him as a little boy – at least for the first half of the film."

Costumes 

An extensive wardrobe was designed for Padmé Amidala by Lucasfilm concept artists and costume designers. Like Leia Organa, one of the inspirations for Padmé was the Flash Gordon character Dale Arden. The wardrobe in The Phantom Menace was designed by concept artist Iain McCaig and costume designer Trisha Biggar; concept artist Dermot Power joined McCaig and Biggar in the design process of Attack of the Clones. Biggar worked as costume designer on the three films. Many costumes were inspired by the historical royal fashions of different cultures. For example, in The Phantom Menace, the dress which Padmé wears when addressing the Senate is based on Mongolian imperial fashion worn by Empress Dondogdulam and Queen Consort Genepil, the wives of Bogd Khan, and other monarchs into the early 20th century. Padmé's travel gown in Attack of the Clones is based on 17th-century Russian fashion photographed on Grand Duchess Xenia Alexandrovna at the Romanov Anniversary Ball in 1903.

The costumes of the prequel trilogy are purposely more elaborate than those of the original trilogy. Lucas asserts that galactic society in the prequels is much more sophisticated. Commenting on the disparities between the two trilogies, Carrie Fisher mused, "Harrison Ford wears the same outfit for three flicks, and I was complaining that I wear, like, six outfits. And my mother – Natalie Portman – she wears three million. She walks through a doorway and there's another outfit. It's like the Liberace of sci-fi changing of clothes." Biggar reveals that originally there were only three costumes planned for Amidala in The Phantom Menace, but "[Lucas] decided that every time we saw [her] she was going to have a different costume." Lucas explains, "Someone of that stature would automatically be changing their costumes to fit the occasion."

Aesthetics aside, the wardrobe was designed to reflect key plot developments. In Attack of the Clones, Lucas wanted Padmé's wardrobe to mirror the romantic elements of the film. He suggested that her costumes be more "sultry in nature." Trisha Biggar notes that Lucas wanted her to appear "sexy, gorgeous, and young in skimpy clothes." Portman laughs, "I got over the hump of 18 so I'm allowed to show tummy now, I guess", so during the battle of Geonosis the bottom part of her top is ripped off revealing her midriff. For Revenge of the Sith, Biggar says, "We knew that Padmé was going to be pregnant through the whole film, and nobody in the outside world could know that. Because she's pregnant, I wanted a soft quality to be apparent in the fabrics that were used."

Some of the costumes created by Biggar's staff did not appear in the final version of the films. In Revenge of the Sith, for example, a multi-colored "Peacock Gown" and a "Green Cut Velvet Robe" worn by Padmé in scenes featuring the Delegation of 2000 were deleted during post-production. Biggar remarks that the Peacock Gown had been one of her favorite designs and that much time and money had been invested in these particular costumes. Ultimately, the Peacock Gown would be used only for the film's theatrical poster. The velvet robe was ultimately re-used for a short scene filmed during pick-up photography, thus appearing in the film, and features on the DVD cover art.

Many of Padmé's costumes in The Phantom Menace were featured in the Japanese magazine High Fashion in 1999 and the Attack of the Clones costumes were in Vogue in 2002. The costumes went on display in the 2005 exhibit Dressing A Galaxy: The Costumes of Star Wars at the Fashion Institute of Design & Merchandising (FIDM) in Los Angeles. Biggar won a Saturn Award for Best Costumes in 2000 for The Phantom Menace and in 2003 for Attack of the Clones. She was nominated in 2006 for Revenge of the Sith, but lost to Isis Mussenden, costume designer for The Chronicles of Narnia: The Lion, the Witch and the Wardrobe (2005).

Character overview 

Padmé Amidala is depicted in Star Wars fiction as beautiful and graceful. In Cloak of Deception, she is described as having "a slight figure and a lovely, feminine face. She is short at 5'5 but is still six inches taller than her daughter Leia, making her much bigger and stronger than her. She was remarkably solemn for one so young. It was clear that she took her responsibilities with the utmost seriousness." Terry Brooks details the alien Nute Gunray's reaction to her appearance: "She was considered beautiful, Gunray had been told, but he had no sense of human beauty and by Neimoidian standards she was simply colorless and small-featured." Brooks writes that she is "young, beautiful, and serene."

The Star Wars Databank describes her as "one of Naboo's best and brightest" and "interested in public service". She demonstrates a devotion to the disadvantaged and deprived beings of the galaxy. Her childhood and adolescence is sacrificed to public service. In the Attack of the Clones novelization, Padmé's sister Sola Naberrie tells her, "You're so tied up in your responsibilities that you don't give any weight to your desires."

Padmé relies on diplomacy to resolve disputes, often appearing as a pacifist. She is not, however, an advocate of appeasement, as she is willing to use "aggressive negotiations" to preserve democracy. The Star Wars Databank notes, "Despite her initial objections to a Republic army, Padmé nonetheless fought alongside the newly created clone troopers against the Separatist droid forces." Film critics Dominique Mainon and James Ursini classify her as a "modern Amazon," a reference to the warrior women of ancient Greek mythology.

Her combat skills are explored further through the Star Wars universe. In Star Wars: Episode II – Attack of the Clones and Star Wars: The Clone Wars, she fights squads of battle droids with martial arts and a blaster. Furthermore, in the film Amidala is shown to be quite physically impressive, and given her larger size compared to Leia uses martial arts more than her. In fact she is able to keep up with Jedi in speed and take huge falls with minimal damage, and even took down an arena beast with one swinging kick. She is an expert markswoman; in the Star Wars: The Clone Wars episode "Assassin", she outguns bounty hunter Aurra Sing.

As a ruler and politician, Padmé is distrustful of bureaucracy, opposed to corruption, and a firm believer in democracy and the rule of law. She tells Anakin, "Popular rule is not democracy .... It gives the people what they want, not what they need." According to Mainon and Ursini, "she tried to preach compromise and reason, [but] the disarray within the [Republic] ... led her to doubt the senate's effectiveness." Her loyalty remains with the Republic until she suspects it no longer represents the democratic principles she espouses. In the novelization of Revenge of the Sith, Padmé advises Senator Bail Organa and Mon Mothma, the founders of what will become the Rebel Alliance, to "Be good little Senators. Mind your manners and keep your heads down. And keep doing ... all those things we can't talk about."

Padmé is sometimes mysterious and deceptive. She is described in Brooks' The Phantom Menace novelization as a "chameleon of sorts, masking herself to the world at large and finding companionship almost exclusively with a cadre of handmaidens who were always with her." Her decision to quietly marry Anakin and secret discussions with other senators about Palpatine add to the character's duplicity. Paul F. McDonald of Space.com observes, "Amidala ... embod[ies] many of the dualities that inform Episode I—war and peace, queen and commoner, form and substance. Unlike other characters, whose personalities are divided and usually warring against one another, her dual nature works to her advantage." He explains, "Amidala can be cold and commanding when she needs to be, or warm and loving as Padmé."

Appearances

Original trilogy

Return of the Jedi 

Return of the Jedi, the final film in the original trilogy, alludes to the character. While in the Ewok village on the forest moon of Endor, Luke Skywalker (Mark Hamill) asks if Princess Leia (Carrie Fisher) remembers their real mother. Leia answers that "she died when I was very young" and also says that "she was very beautiful... kind... but sad", while Luke confesses to have no memories of their mother. An extended scene of Return of the Jedi expands on the fate of Luke and Leia's (then-unnamed) mother.

Prequel trilogy

The Phantom Menace 

Padmé Amidala makes her first film appearance in The Phantom Menace. She is introduced as the recently elected 14-year-old queen of Naboo, dedicated to ending the planet's occupation by the Trade Federation. She attempts to deal directly with Federation Viceroy Nute Gunray (Silas Carson), who attempts to force her to sign a treaty which would legitimize the Trade Federation's occupation of Naboo. Padmé escapes from Naboo with the help of Jedi Master Qui-Gon Jinn (Liam Neeson) and his Padawan Obi-Wan Kenobi (Ewan McGregor), but they are forced to land on the desert planet of Tatooine after the ship's hyperdrive generator malfunctions. Disguised as a handmaiden, Padmé meets nine-year-old slave Anakin Skywalker (Jake Lloyd) and his mother Shmi (Pernilla August). She witnesses Anakin win the podrace at the Boonta Eve Classic that both aids her mission to Coruscant and secures his freedom. She and Anakin bond during their journey from Tatooine to Coruscant, with her comforting him over his sadness at being separated from his mother and him giving her a hand-carved charm on a leather necklace.

Arriving on Coruscant, Padmé consults with Naboo's Senator, Palpatine (Ian McDiarmid), who encourages her to appeal to the Senate to resolve Naboo's dispute with the Trade Federation. Palpatine, who is secretly the Sith Lord Darth Sidious who controls the Trade Federation, persuades her to make a motion in the Senate to have Supreme Chancellor Finis Valorum (Terence Stamp) voted out from office, which later enables Palpatine to be elected in his place. Padmé returns to Naboo to fight for her planet's freedom, enlisting the aid of Jar Jar Binks (Ahmed Best) and his Gungan tribe and having her handmaiden Sabé (Keira Knightley) pose as her. As Sabé attempts a peace deal between Naboo and the Gungans, Padmé intervenes and reveals her true identity. The Gungans agree to help and offer a diversion to lure the droid armies away from the palace, which has been seized by Viceroy Gunray of the Trade Federation. A small force led by Padmé then enters the palace and captures Gunray, ending the trade blockade of Naboo once and for all. A celebration is held to announce the unity between Naboo and the Gungans.

Attack of the Clones 

Padmé Amidala makes her second film appearance in Attack of the Clones, which is set 10 years later. Now holding office as Senator following her term as queen, she represents Naboo in the Galactic Senate and leads a faction opposed to the Military Creation Act that would create an army of clones for the Republic, which has been threatened by a growing Separatist movement. As she arrives on Coruscant to cast her vote, assassins hired by the Separatists attempt to kill her. Jedi Knight Obi-Wan Kenobi and Padawan Anakin Skywalker (Hayden Christensen) are assigned to protect Padmé. Palpatine sends Padmé into hiding on Naboo, where she and Anakin struggle to maintain a platonic relationship despite their obvious mutual attraction. In a deleted scene, Padmé introduces Anakin to her parents, Ruwee (Graeme Blundell) and Jobal Naberrie (Trisha Noble), and informs him of her charitable work with the Refugee Relief Movement, a galaxy-wide disaster relief and resettlement organization.

When Anakin has a vision of his mother in danger, Padmé accompanies him to Tatooine in a failed attempt to rescue Shmi from a band of Tusken Raiders. Anakin returns with Shmi's body and confesses to Padmé that he slaughtered the entire Tusken tribe. Padmé is troubled by what Anakin has done, but nevertheless comforts him. After they receive a message from Obi-Wan on the planet Geonosis, Padmé and Anakin rush to his aid, only to be captured themselves and condemned to death in a Geonosian coliseum by Separatist leader and Sith Lord Count Dooku (Christopher Lee). They declare their love to each other, just before they are saved by Jedi Masters Mace Windu (Samuel L. Jackson) and Yoda (Frank Oz) leading an army of Jedi and clone troopers, thus marking the beginning of the Clone Wars. Afterwards, Padmé and Anakin are married in a secret ceremony on Naboo, with R2-D2 (Kenny Baker) and C-3PO (Anthony Daniels) as witnesses.

Revenge of the Sith 

Padmé Amidala makes her third film appearance in Revenge of the Sith, which is set three years after the beginning of the Clone Wars. After Anakin returns from rescuing Palpatine, she informs him that she is pregnant. Padmé detects changes in Anakin after he begins having prophetic visions of her dying in childbirth. Eventually, Palpatine plays on Anakin's fears by saying that the dark side of the Force holds the power to save Padmé, which ultimately leads to Anakin becoming Palpatine's Sith apprentice, Darth Vader. Meanwhile, Padmé watches with increasing suspicion as Palpatine uses the Clone Wars as an excuse to take near-total control of the Senate and judiciary. In another deleted scene, Padmé is seen as a dissenter in Palpatine's government and an early constituting member of the Alliance to Restore the Republic – the future Rebel Alliance – along with senators Bail Organa (Jimmy Smits) and Mon Mothma (Genevieve O'Reilly).

As Palpatine declares martial law by transforming the Republic into the Galactic Empire and declaring himself Emperor, Padmé remarks to Organa: "So this is how liberty dies—with thunderous applause." Obi-Wan informs Padmé that Anakin has been seduced to the dark side of the Force by Palpatine, who is actually the mastermind of the war, and killed everyone in the Jedi Temple, including children.

Unable to believe this, Padmé travels to the volcanic planet Mustafar, where Vader had gone to assassinate the Separatist leaders, unaware that Obi-Wan has stowed away aboard her ship. Padmé begs Vader to escape Palpatine's grasp with her, but Vader insists that together they can overthrow Palpatine and rule the galaxy. Padmé recoils in horror, but still tries to persuade him to abandon the dark side. When Obi-Wan emerges from her ship, Vader accuses Padmé of betrayal and uses the Force to choke her into unconsciousness.

After Obi-Wan defeats Vader in a lightsaber duel, he brings Padmé to the secret asteroid base Polis Massa. She dies soon after delivering twins, Luke and Leia. Just prior to her death, Padmé insists to Obi-Wan that she knows "there is still good" in Vader. After Padmé's body is altered to appear still pregnant and given an elaborate funeral ceremony on Naboo, on Yoda's command, her twins are separated to be hidden from the Empire. Leia is adopted by Organa and his wife on Alderaan to be raised as a princess, while Obi-Wan brings Luke to Tatooine, where the boy is to be raised by Vader's stepbrother Owen Lars (Joel Edgerton) and his wife Beru (Bonnie Piesse).

Live-action series

Obi-Wan Kenobi
Padmé appears in a flashback at the beginning of Part I in Obi-Wan Kenobi.

Animated series

The Clone Wars 
Padmé Amidala (voiced by Catherine Taber) makes her fourth film appearance in Star Wars: The Clone Wars. While Anakin (voiced by Matt Lanter) and his Padawan Ahsoka Tano (voiced by Ashley Eckstein) search for Jabba the Hutt's son Rotta, Padmé meets Jabba's uncle Ziro the Hutt (voiced by Corey Burton) at his palace on Coruscant to convince him to side with the Jedi. After Ziro forcibly removes Padmé, she escapes and eavesdrops on his communication with Count Dooku and the Separatists about an elaborate scheme to kill Rotta, frame the Jedi for his murder and force Jabba to attempt revenge, leaving Ziro as the Hutts' ruler. After being discovered, Dooku suggests Ziro collect the bounty placed on her head. When battle droids confiscate Padmé's comlink and blaster, she outwits and tricks one into activating her comlink as C-3PO is attempting to contact her before a droid smashes the device. C-3PO leads a squad of Coruscant Guard troopers to rescue her. Padmé then contacts Jabba just as the Hutt is about to execute Anakin and Ahsoka, and forces Ziro to confess his betrayal to Jabba. Padmé proceeds to negotiate an alliance between the Republic and the Hutts which would allow Republic warships to use unknown Hutt hyperspace lanes.

In the subsequent TV series, Padmé is mostly portrayed working in the Senate toward a peaceful resolution to the Clone Wars, although a few episodes have portrayed her fighting the Separatists alongside Anakin, Ahsoka and Jar Jar Binks. She has appeared in seven episodes in the first season and third season, four episodes in the second season, nine episodes in the fourth season, and one episode in the fifth season. A trilogy of episodes were set with her as the main focus in which she meets with her old colleague and former lover Rush Clovis (voiced by Robin Atkin Downes), causing Anakin to become jealous; these episodes were released in season six.

Forces of Destiny (2017)
Padmé appears in the micro-series Star Wars: Forces of Destiny, again voiced by Catherine Taber.

Tales of the Jedi
Padmé's funeral is recreated in Tales of the Jedi in the sixth episode "Resolve".

Literature

The novelizations of the Star Wars prequel films introduced material about Padmé Amidala that was not included in the films. Terry Brooks' The Phantom Menace (1999) includes a discussion between Qui-Gon and Obi-Wan in which the former describes the then-queen of Naboo as "something of an unknown" before the Trade Federation blockade. In the Attack of the Clones (2002) adaptation by R. A. Salvatore, there is a detailed conversation between Padmé and her sister Sola Naberrie shortly after Queen Jamillia appoints her senator. Sola chides her for ignoring her personal life: "What about Padmé Amidala? Have you even thought about what might make your life better?" Matthew Stover's Revenge of the Sith (2005) elaborates upon Padmé's role in the formation of the Rebel Alliance. Stover narrates Darth Vader's reaction to the death of his wife: Vader thinks to himself, "You killed her because, finally, when you could have saved her, when you could have gone away with her, when you could have been thinking about her, you were thinking about yourself."

, a novel by E. K. Johnston released on March 5, 2019, features Padmé as the main character, as well as several of her handmaidens—especially Sabé. Set four years after the events of The Phantom Menace, it reveals that as she ended her reign as queen and became a senator, Padmé helped liberate a number of slaves on Tatooine, but was unsuccessful in freeing Shmi. Padmé meets Clovis in a Senate orientation group, Captain Typho takes over for his uncle Captain Panaka as Padmé's bodyguard, and Amidala's relationship with Bail Organa and Palpatine is explored. In an epilogue set after Revenge of the Sith, Sabé determines to investigate Padmé's death. A prequel to the novel, titled Queen's Peril, was scheduled to be released on May 5, 2020, but was later delayed to June 2. It is set soon before and during The Phantom Menace. A third novel to complete the "Amidala Trilogy", Queen's Hope, published on April 5, 2022
taking place after her secret marriage to Anakin. The final novel focuses on a secret mission that Padmé takes on early in the Clone Wars and parallels with Sabé's mission to impersonate her in the Senate.  

Padmé also appears in flashbacks in the novel Thrawn: Alliances. In the limited Marvel comic series Princess Leia, Leia briefly sees a vision of Queen Amidala while visiting Naboo.

Video games
Padmé also appears in console games based on the Star Wars franchise and made prominent appearances in the ones based on the Clone Wars timeline and often appearing as a playable character.

Legends
In April 2014, most of the licensed Star Wars novels and comics produced since the originating 1977 film Star Wars were rebranded by Lucasfilm as Star Wars Legends and declared non-canon.

Clone Wars (2003) 

Padmé Amidala appears in eight chapters of the Star Wars: Clone Wars micro-series that aired on Cartoon Network from 2003 to 2005. She is secluded on Coruscant and maintains a correspondence with Anakin while he is fighting in the Clone Wars. In one chapter, Padmé travels with Yoda (voiced by Tom Kane) aboard her ship when he senses a disturbance in the Force coming from the ice planet Ilum. Despite Captain Typho's (voiced by James C. Mathis) protest, she accompanies Yoda and helps rescue Jedi Master Luminara Unduli (voiced by Cree Summer) and Padawan Barriss Offee (voiced by Tatyana Yassukovich). In another chapter, she is thrilled by Anakin's graduation to Jedi Knight, and stores his Padawan braid with the necklace he gave her in The Phantom Menace. In the final chapter, Padmé is briefly seen during General Grievous' assault on Coruscant.

Novels and comics 
Padmé's background prior to her appearance in the prequel films is revealed in Star Wars novels and comics. In Terry Moore's comic "A Summer's Dream" printed in Star Wars Tales 5 (2000) and set a year before the events of The Phantom Menace, Padmé is the Princess of Theed, Naboo's capital city. A young man, Ian Lago, falls in love with Padmé, but she places her duty to the people over her personal happiness and rejects him. Lago is the son of an advisor to King Veruna, the reigning monarch of Naboo.

In the novel, Cloak of Deception (2001) by James Luceno, King Veruna is forced to abdicate the throne following accusations of corruption. Padmé is elected Queen of Naboo and contacts Palpatine to inform him that Veruna has been mysteriously killed. She and Palpatine discuss the events that lead to the Trade Federation blockade of Naboo. She admits to him, "Naboo can scarcely afford to become embroiled in a dispute that pits the Republic against the Trade Federation."

Star Wars literature focuses on Padmé's career as ruling monarch of Naboo. The young-adult novel Star Wars Episode I Journal: Amidala (1999) by Jude Watson focuses on Padmé Amidala's early career and narrow escape from the Trade Federation. The Queen's Amulet (1999) by Julianne Balmain narrates the close friendship between Padmé and her handmaiden Sabé immediately before the events of The Phantom Menace. Erik Tiemens's short comic "The Artist of Naboo" follows a young, unnamed artist on Naboo who becomes captivated by Padmé's beauty, features her in a series of paintings and later risks his life to save her.

Padmé's role in the Delegation of 2000—the senatorial resistance movement to Palpatine's growing absolutism—is discussed in James Luceno's Labyrinth of Evil (2005). The Delegation of 2000 is primarily concerned with Palpatine's calls for public surveillance and restrictions on freedom of movement and action. Still, Padmé is confident Palpatine will relinquish his power when the crisis is over: "He's not stubborn," she tells Bail Organa. "You just don't know him as I do. He'll take our concerns to heart."

Padmé appears in novels and comics set after the events of the original trilogy as holograms and flashbacks. In Troy Denning's The Joiner King (2005), the first book in the Dark Nest trilogy, set 35 years after the events of A New Hope, Luke Skywalker discovers a hologram recorded by R2-D2 of Anakin Skywalker informing Padmé of his vision of her death in childbirth. This is the first time Luke sees his mother. Another hologram discovered in R2-D2 chronicles a conversation between Padmé and Obi-Wan. In this hologram, Luke and Leia hear their mother's name for the first time. In the final novel of the trilogy, The Swarm War, Luke and Leia see their mother's death and their own births.

Reception
Reactions by critics to Portman's performances were mixed. James Berardinelli called her acting in The Phantom Menace "lackluster," while Annlee Ellingson of Box Office Magazine said "Portman's delivery is stiff and flat, perhaps hindered by the gorgeous but cumbersome costumes." In his review of Attack of the Clones, Mike Clark of USA Today complained about Portman and Hayden Christensen, who portrayed Anakin; he wrote, "Both speak in monotone for doubly deadly effect, though when not burdened by his co-star, Christensen often finds the emotion in his limited intonations." Ed Halter of The Village Voice, reviewing Revenge of the Sith, said that "computer-generated characters like wheezing cyborg baddie General Grievous and blippeting fireplug R2-D2" "emot[ed] more convincingly than either Natalie Portman or Hayden Christensen." Nonetheless, Mick LaSalle of the San Francisco Chronicle described Portman's performance in Revenge of the Sith as "decorative and sympathetic".

Critics have blamed Portman's performance on Lucas' direction and script. Roger Ebert, for example, charged that in Attack of the Clones "too much of ... the film is given over to a romance between Padmé and Anakin in which they're incapable of uttering anything other than the most basic and weary romantic clichés, while regarding each other as if love was something to be endured rather than cherished." He offered a similar critique for Revenge of the Sith: "To say that George Lucas cannot write a love scene is an understatement; greeting cards have expressed more passion."
Todd McCarthy of Variety likewise lamented that "Lucas's shortcomings as a writer and director of intimate, one-on-one scenes" hampered Portman's performance.

In 2017, Rolling Stone magazine placed Padmé Amidala at the number 45 spot on their 50 Best Star Wars Characters of All Time list. Pop culture website IGN named her the 25th greatest Star Wars character in their Top 100 countdown. In 2019, Esquire magazine ranked her 28th on their 40 Greatest Star Wars Characters list.

Despite the mixed reception among critics, Portman was nominated for three Saturn Awards.

Family tree

See also 

Women warriors in literature and culture

References

Further reading 

 Biggar, Trisha. Dressing a Galaxy: The Costumes of Star Wars. New York: Harry N. Abrams, 2005. .
 Wallace, Daniel. The New Essential Guide to Characters. New York: Del Rey, 2002. .
 Wallace, Daniel, and Kevin J. Anderson. The New Essential Chronology. New York: Del Rey, 2005. .

External links

Dressing A Galaxy: The Costumes of Star Wars, an exhibit at the Fashion Institute of Design & Merchandising.

Characters created by George Lucas
Star Wars comics characters
Star Wars literary characters
Star Wars Skywalker Saga characters
Star Wars: The Clone Wars characters
Star Wars video game characters
Female characters in film
Female characters in television
Teenage characters in film
Teenage characters in television
Fantasy television characters
Film characters introduced in 1999
Fictional diplomats
Fictional extraterrestrial princesses
Fictional pacifists
Fictional queens
Fictional senators
Fictional women soldiers and warriors